MUF or muf may refer to:

 MUF (programming language), "Multi-User Forth"
 Main Uralian Fault, in the Ural Mountains of Russia
 Maximum usable frequency, a term used for radio transmissions
 Moderata Ungdomsförbundet, or Moderate Youth League, Sweden
 Manchester United Football Ground railway station, UK, station code
 IATA code for Muting Airport, Indonesia
 muf, London collaborative of artists and architects
 Muslim United Front, Kashmiri political coalition
 Material unaccounted for, a discrepancy in an inventory of nuclear material

See also
 Muff (disambiguation)